Winners Take All is a Quiet Riot compilation album.

Track listing
"Cum on Feel the Noize"
"Party All Night"
"The Wild and the Young"
"Winners Take All"
"Metal Health"
"Scream and Shout"
"Put Up or Shut Up"
"Mama Weer All Crazee Now"
"King of the Hill"
"Let's Get Crazy"

Quiet Riot albums